Small Demon is a 1995 Russian mystery drama film directed by Nikolay Dostal.

Plot 
The film takes place in a small provincial town, populated by boring and stupid people. Gymnasium teacher Ardalyon Borisovich Peredonov dreams of moving to the capital, his second cousin Varvara wants to marry him and begins to write him letters of invitation to St. Petersburg on behalf of the Princess.

Cast 
 Sergey Taramaev as Peredonov
 Irina Rozanova as Varvara
 Polina Kutepova as Lyudmila
 Aleksey Elistratov as Pylnikov
 Sergey Batalov as Volodin
 Aleksey Mironov as Khripach, director of the gymnasium
 Gennady Nazarov as Rutilov
 Agrippina Steklova as Daria
 Kseniya Kutepova as Valeriya
 Elena Mayorova as Vershina
 Tatyana Kravchenko as  Yershikha
 Roman Madyanov as Tcherepnin
 Aleksei Kravchenko as gymnastics teacher
 Galina Stakhanova as Kokovkina

References

External links 
 

1995 films
1990s Russian-language films
Russian mystery films
Russian drama films
1990s mystery drama films
Mosfilm films
Films based on Russian novels